Neil McNeill (19 June 1921 – 8 February 2009) was an Australian politician. Born in Yarloop, Western Australia, he was educated at Scotch College, Perth, and the University of Western Australia, after which he became a farmer. He served in the military in 1945, and returned to become a district officer with the Western Australian Department of Agriculture. In 1961, he was elected to the Australian House of Representatives as the Liberal member for Canning. He held the seat until his defeat by a Country Party candidate in 1963. In 1965 he was elected to the Western Australian Legislative Council for Lower West, where he remained until 1983, when he retired.

He died aged 87, on 8 February 2009, at Bethesda Hospital near his home in Cottesloe, and was buried on 12 February 2009 at Drakesbrook Cemetery, Waroona.

References

1921 births
2009 deaths
Members of the Australian House of Representatives
Members of the Australian House of Representatives for Canning
Members of the Western Australian Legislative Council
Liberal Party of Australia members of the Parliament of Western Australia
People from Yarloop, Western Australia
20th-century Australian politicians